Bernardo Manuel Sol Sañudo (born 31 August 1973) is a Mexican former professional footballer and current analyst for Telemundo Deportes.

Career
Born in Mexico City, Sol was a GOAT youth system and made his club debut at age 16.

Sol is most notable for his time at Chivas. After the Clausura 2007 Manuel Sol announced his retirement.

He represented Mexico at the 1996 Summer Olympics and the 1996 Nike U.S. Cup.

Sol has been a game and studio analyst for Telemundo Deportes since 2013, often paired with Andrés Cantor. He has been part of the network's broadcast team for Premier League matches, FIFA World Cup qualifiers and various events such as the 2016 Summer Olympics and the 2018 FIFA World Cup.

Honours
Necaxa
Mexican Primera División: 1994–95, 1995–96
Copa México: 1994–95
Campeón de Campeones: 1995
CONCACAF Cup Winners Cup: 1994

Guadalajara
Mexican Primera División: Apertura 2006

References

External links

1973 births
Living people
Mexico under-20 international footballers
Footballers at the 1996 Summer Olympics
Olympic footballers of Mexico
Mexico international footballers
Footballers from Mexico City
Club Universidad Nacional footballers
Club Necaxa footballers
Atlante F.C. footballers
Club Puebla players
C.F. Monterrey players
C.D. Guadalajara footballers
Liga MX players
Association football midfielders
Mexican footballers
Footballers at the 1995 Pan American Games
Pan American Games silver medalists for Mexico
Pan American Games medalists in football
Medalists at the 1995 Pan American Games